Agila (International title: Eagle) is a Philippine teledrama produced by TAPE Inc. and broadcast from September 7, 1987 to February 7, 1992 aired on RPN and on ABS-CBN.

Cast
 Val Sotto as Gabriel Agila
 Delia Razon as Doña Maura Agila
 Helen Vela† as Ester Morena
 Laarni Enriquez as Olivia (in the first-part)
Vivian Foz as Olivia (in the second-part to the end)
 Aurora Sevilla as Liweng
 Keempee de Leon as Bobet M. Agila – the eldest son of Gabriel & Ester
 Jeffrey Sison
 Rosalinda Olivarez as Minyang
 Lawrence Olivarez as boy hapon
 RR Herrera as Jun-jun – the son of Gabriel & Liweng
 Arabelle Cadocio as Nina – the daughter of Gabriel & Olivia
 Roger Aquino as Rod
 Ana Feliciano as Mimosa
 Lito Legaspi†
 Yda Yaneza as Ludy
 Mely Tagasa† as Lola Belen
 Roy Alvarez† as Lauro
 Rey Sagum as Max
 Tom Olivar as Satur
 Sonny Parsons†
 Vanessa Escano as Teacher Agnes (in the second-part to the end)
 Toby Alejar

Accolades
In 1988, Agila won the award for Best Afternoon Drama Series at the 2nd PMPC Star Awards for Television. In 1991, the series won the award for Best Drama Serial at the 5th PMPC Star Awards for Television.

Broadcast history
It was broadcast and co-produced by RPN on September 7, 1987, as a replacement to another TAPE-produced drama Heredero. It is aired at 1:30 pm right after TV show Eat Bulaga!. When RPN, along with its sister company IBC, was sequestrated in 1989, Agila, with Eat Bulaga!, Coney Reyes on Camera from RPN and Okay Ka, Fairy Ko! from IBC, was moved to ABS-CBN on February 20 and it started to be co-produced and broadcast that year. It made its final episode on February 7, 1992, for four years.

See also
List of programs broadcast by ABS-CBN
List of programs previously broadcast by Radio Philippines Network

References

External links

1980s Philippine television series
1990s Philippine television series
1987 Philippine television series debuts
1992 Philippine television series endings
ABS-CBN drama series
Filipino-language television shows
ABS-CBN original programming
Radio Philippines Network original programming
Television series by TAPE Inc.
Television shows set in the Philippines